Jarmo "Lamu" Jokivalli is a Finnish male curler.

At the national level, he is a four-time Finnish men's champion curler (1985, 1986, 1987, 1988).

Teams

References

External links

 MM 1988 — jussiupn.kapsi.fi
 Curling — jussiupn.kapsi.fi

Living people
Finnish male curlers
Finnish curling champions
Year of birth missing (living people)
Place of birth missing (living people)
20th-century Finnish people